Plumley Mountain is a mountain in Raleigh County, West Virginia. The mountain is named for the Plumley family of West Virginia history, and its highest elevation is at Plumley Knob.

References 

Landforms of Raleigh County, West Virginia
Mountains of West Virginia